The tityras  are passerine birds in the genus Tityra of the family Tityridae. They are found from southern Mexico, through Central America, to northern and central South America, including Trinidad.

The adult males are greyish-white above and white below, except for the wings and tail which are at least partially black. The males of all three species also have black head markings. The females are similar, but are duller, with browner or greyer head markings. The black-tailed and the masked tityra both have a conspicuous red eye-ring and base of the bill.

Taxonomy
The genus Tityra was introduced by French ornithologist Louis Jean Pierre Vieillot in 1816, with the black-tailed tityra named as the type species. The genus name comes from "Tityri" – the name given by the Ancient Greeks to the satyrs and other mythological companions of Pan and Bacchus. This is a reference to the boisterous, aggressive behavior of the type species.

The tityras have traditionally been placed in the cotinga or the tyrant flycatcher family, but evidence strongly suggests they are better placed in Tityridae, where now placed by South American Classification Committee. The black-crowned tityra is sometimes placed in a separate genus, Erator.

The genus contains three species.

Behavior
These species are found in forest clearings and edges, second growth and other semi-open habitats such as plantation shade trees.  The eggs are laid in a bed of dry leaves in a tree hole, often an old woodpecker nest. The female incubates alone, but both parents feed the chicks. Fledging takes up to 25 days.

Tityras are seen alone or in pairs, perched conspicuously as they feed on medium-sized fruits, large insects and sometimes small lizards. They have unmusical nasal grunting or buzzing calls.

Another species, the white-tailed tityra (Tityra leucura), is generally considered a variant of the black-crowned tityra, but recent evidence suggests it may be a valid species restricted to the Brazilian Amazon near the Madeira River.

References

Sources

 
 
 

 Hilty, Birds of Venezuela 

 
Bird genera
 
Taxa named by Louis Jean Pierre Vieillot

fr:Tityrinae